The Maritime Line is a railway line that runs in the valley of the River Fal from Truro, the county town, to Falmouth on the south coast of Cornwall, England.

History

The railway line, now known as The Maritime Line, was built by the Cornwall Railway as a broad gauge line of  gauge from Plymouth to Falmouth. The purpose of the scheme was to link London with Falmouth, a port where packet ships sailed to destinations in Europe, Africa, and America. As the main line of the company, the line was intended to be constructed as double-track throughout.

Construction commenced in 1847 but the main contractor suffered financial problems which put a temporary stop to any work. Efforts restarted in 1859 on completion of the line from Plymouth to Truro which opened on 4 May that year. The inhabitants of Falmouth soon put pressure on the company to complete the line to their town as originally intended, and a further Act of Parliament was obtained in 1861. The line was costly to build with six viaducts and two tunnels and it opened on 24 August 1863, by which time the packet ships had been diverted elsewhere. The connection from Falmouth station to the docks was opened in 1864.

After the West Cornwall Railway was converted to broad gauge in 1867, the Truro to Falmouth line tended to be operated as a branch, with the trains from London Paddington operating to Penzance instead.

The line terminated at the Town station for five years before reopening to the original terminus at the docks in 1975 to permit through services from London.

Great Western and BR
The Cornwall Railway was amalgamated into the Great Western Railway on 1 July 1889. Following the amalgamation, plans were put in place for conversion to standard gauge, which took place over the weekend of 21 May 1892. The Great Western Railway was nationalised into British Railways on 1 January 1948.

Privatisation
Britain's railways were privatised in the 1990s. At privatisation, the line was operated by  Wales & West train operating company for a few years until the company split. From 14 October 2001, the Maritime Line became the responsibility of Wessex Trains.

When the franchise became due for renewal, the tender was won by First Great Western (which has since rebranded as Great Western Railway) and the company took over the operation on 1 April 2006.

Community rail
The Maritime Line is one of the railway lines supported by the Devon and Cornwall Rail Partnership, an organisation formed in 1991 to promote railway services in the area.  The line is promoted by many means such as regular timetable and scenic line guides, as well as leaflets highlighting leisure opportunities such as walking, birdwatching, and visiting country pubs.

The Maritime Line rail ale trail was launched in 2003 to encourage rail travellers to visit pubs near the line.  Of the 14 participating pubs, four are in Truro, one in Perranwell, three in Penryn, and four in Falmouth. 10 stamps collected in the Rail Ale Trail leaflet entitle the participant to claim special Maritime Line Rail Trail tour shirt. The Rail Partnership promote a Foodie Guide to the line to encourage people to visit local cafes, restaurants and food events.

Wessex Trains painted a Class 150 two-car DMU (number 150265) in coloured pictures promoting the line and named it The Falmouth Flyer.  The unit continued in service with First Great Western when the company won the franchise but it has now been repainted in the standard fleet colours.  While in the pictorial livery the unit worked throughout the southwest, and not just on its named line.

The branch was designated by the Department for Transport as a community rail line in September 2006.  This aims to increase the number of passengers and reduce costs.  Strategies for investigation include more effective revenue collection, a passing loop, improved bus links, and working with ferry operators and colleges in the area.

Improvements in 2009 

The line was originally double track at Penryn, to provide a crossing place. Evidence of the double track can be seen at Penryn station, where two platforms are still visible. The Beeching Report in the 1960s instigated the reduction of the line there from two to one. In 2004 a proposal was put forward to reinstate a passing loop on the line, to allow for a doubling of service frequency.  Funding was agreed with £4.67 million coming from European Union funds, £2.5 million from Cornwall Council, and £600,000 from Network Rail.  The new  loop was installed over two long weekends in October 2008 and work on the platform extension was also started. The loop was brought into use ahead of schedule and to budget, with the formal opening by Kevin Lavery, the Chief Executive of Cornwall Council, taking place at Penryn station on 18 May 2009.  Works included a new car park and waiting shelter at Penryn, in addition to the new loop, signalling and platform lengthening.

Route

Communities served
Truro – Perranarworthal – Penryn – Falmouth.

Route description
Maritime Line trains start from Truro railway station, usually originating from the bay platform, at the left side of the main platform beyond the footbridge. The trains join the main line for the first half-mile to Penwithers Junction, passing through the -long Higher Town Tunnel on the way. At this point the line to Penzance curves away to the right; the line to Falmouth was originally the Cornwall Railway main line and so runs straight ahead while the Penzance line was built by the West Cornwall Railway Company. When originally built, tho two lines here ran as parallel single line but were completely separate; the connection at Penwithers Junction only being made in 1893 when the section was converted to double track. The Maritime Line today only has a junction with the westbound (down) line; trains running towards Truro (the up direction) come inbound on the down main line, the same line used by trains departing Truro for Penzance. The line from Penwithers Junction to Falmouth Docks has always been single track.

From the tunnel the line emerges into the countryside outside Truro. The small excavated area of land on the left is a local nature reserve which supports rare plants due to its unusual position in a triangle of rail routes - the Maritime Line, the disused continuation of the West Cornwall Railway to the riverside at Newham, and a never-built route allowing Cornwall Railway trains to reach Newham. The route to Newham is now a cycle path round the edge of the city.

One and a half miles from the junction, the line enters Sparnick Tunnel, which is a little over a quarter of a mile long. Although the line has only ever had a single track, most of the engineering, including the tunnels, was designed to carry a second one.

The line, which heads south-westwards until this point, now heads towards the south and passes high above the silted-up Restronguet Creek on Carnon viaduct. This valley was the route of the Redruth and Chasewater Railway down to quays at Devoran, about a mile beyond the viaduct. It is now part of the Mineral Tramway Trails.

A half-mile later, the line comes to Perranwell railway station, nearly four miles from Truro. A modern shelter is situated on the platform, built in a style inspired by older railway buildings. As with all stations except for Truro, the platform is on the left as the train travels towards Falmouth. In the forecourt is the old Cornwall Railway goods shed.

The line now begins to head west, passing over the short Perran Viaduct and then south again along the hillside above Perranwell village before passing through the -long Perran Tunnel.

Turning south-eastwards, the line now passes over Ponsanooth Viaduct, the tallest on the line. Ponsanooth village is on the hillside to the right, while the River Kennal runs below to join up with Restronguet Creek.

The line passes beneath the A39 road from Truro to Falmouth at Treluswell, Four Cross, and then shortly enters Penryn which grew up at the head of a large inlet of the River Fal. Penryn railway station is at the top of the town, and there are views across the town to St Gluvias on the other side of the harbour. The station is eight and a quarter miles from Truro, and the platform shelter is identical to the one at Perranwell. Beyond the station the line passes over the Collegewood Viaduct. The last timber railway viaduct in Cornwall was here, but was replaced by this stone structure on 22 July 1934.

At Penryn there is a wide open space now occupied by student housing for the Tremough Campus of the University of Falmouth. This was the goods yard where wagons were loaded and unloaded. There is also another platform visible on the other side of the train, though it is overgrown.

The line soon enters the outskirts of Falmouth. The town was established at the entrance to the inlet that leads to Penryn; it has now nearly spread to reach that town. Trains first call at the Penmere railway station, useful for people heading for the top of The Moor in the town centre, or for the newer western suburbs.

Passengers get a quick glimpse on their right of Falmouth Bay before trains call at the concrete platform of Falmouth Town railway station, which is nearer the National Maritime Museum, the waterside, and the shops. The station itself was constructed using items that were reclaimed from Perranporth Beach Halt after that station closed.

It is now just a short distance to the terminus at Falmouth Docks railway station,  from Truro. Falmouth Docks are below the station on the left, Pendennis Castle overlooks both these and the Gyllyngvase Beach on the other side of the line. Sidings serve the docks but are little used.

Infrastructure
When the line opened the signals were controlled by 'policemen' who walked between them. Signals and points at Truro station were in 1874 and signal boxes built in 1876. Other signal boxes were built at
 Penwithers Junction. Opened by 1879, rebuilt 1893, closed 7 November 1971. 36 Levers.
 Perranwell. Opened 1894, closed 18 April 1966. Built in an elevated position next to the platform above a siding. 21 levers.
 Penryn. Opening date unknown, rebuilt 1894 and again 14 June 1923, closed 7 November 1971 when replaced by a Ground Frame which was itself removed in 1979. 32 levers from 1923.
 Falmouth. Opening date unknown, rebuilt 1894, closed 27 February 1966 when replaced by a Ground Frame.

The Maritime Line crosses several steep-sided valleys that carry tributaries of the River Fal and there were originally eight viaducts built to cross these:
Originally ten stone piers each topped by a wooden fan but buried in an embankment as an alternative to rebuilding in 1926.
Originally of stone piers topped by a series of wooden fans. Scheduled for rebuilding in 1880 but replaced by an embankment in 1933.
Originally eleven stone piers each topped by a wooden fan but a new viaduct of 9 stone piers built adjacent in 1933.
Originally five stone piers each topped by a wooden fan but a new viaduct also of 5 stone piers built adjacent in 1927.
Originally of stone piers topped by a series of wooden fans but a new viaduct built adjacent in 1930.
Originally of stone piers topped by a series of wooden fans but made redundant when the track was realigned on an embankment in 1923.
Originally of five stone piers each topped by a wooden fan but made redundant with a major track realignment in 1923 that also involved changing the location of Penryn Station.
Originally fourteen stone piers each topped by a wooden fan built on a left-handed curve (travelling in the down direction). It was replaced by a stone version built alongside in 1934 by which time it was the last surviving Brunel wooden viaduct in Cornwall.

Passenger volume
The majority of passengers on the Maritime Line travel between Truro and the three stations in Falmouth, the busiest of which is Falmouth Town although passenger numbers at Falmouth Docks increased faster. Comparing the year from April 2008 to that which started in April 2002, passenger numbers at the Docks station increased by 214% while those at the Town station increased by 38% and at Penmere increased by 42%. Since the doubling of train frequency the increases have been greater still. For example, between the years starting 2002 and 2010 Penryn's passenger count rose by 247%, Penmere by 126% and Falmouth Docks by 266%. Falmouth Town has increased further by 109%. Even Perranwell (where the extra trains do not always stop) has increased by a healthy 93%

Services

Passenger services

At the opening of the Cornwall Railway there were five trains to and from Falmouth daily with two trains running on Sundays, with trains carrying first, second and third class accommodation.

After the connection between the Cornwall Railway and the West Cornwall Railway the line to Falmouth was considered a branch line and local services were run on an out-and-back basis from Truro.

Before World War I the winter timetable for the Cornish Riviera Express showed that it included at least one through carriage for Falmouth, this being detached/attached at Truro, and this facility continued until the summer of 1939 until the advent of World War 2 when that train ran through to Penzance only without any portions being attached/detached for any of the Cornish branches.

During the 1950s through trains were again a feature of traffic on the line, and other than London Paddington, Bradford was one of the less likely destinations for a though train.

Service in the 1960s was 16 or 17 trains daily, and had been reduced to 12 by 1975. In 1984 there were still 12 trains each way every day on summer Saturdays with 11 trains each way on weekdays and winter Saturdays, although the last train from Falmouth left earlier on summer Saturdays than on weekdays. In addition there were 8 trains each way on summer Sundays with the first train not leaving Truro until 10.35 but there was no Sunday service after 9 September.

By 2008 there were 13 trains each way, but with the new loop installed at  the May 2009 timetable provides for 29 allowing for a service interval of 30 minutes. The enhanced timetable resulted in trains being formed with one coach instead of the former two, but the increase in demand has resulted in GWR allocating sufficient stock to enable both services to be operated by two car units from 2012.  was a request stop for many years, but trains have called without being requested since 2017.

Locomotives and stock
During the 1960s and 1970 local services between Truro and Falmouth were operated by Diesel multiple units based at Plymouth Laira including Metro-Cammell Class 101s, BRCW Class 118s, BR Swindon Class 120s and Gloucester single units.

Locomotive-hauled trains between Paddington and Falmouth were restored during the summer timetable from 1975 but ceased again at the end of the 1979 summer timetable. During this period the services consisted on BR Mk2 D/E/F coaches typically hauled by a Class 50. 

In the 2000s, passenger services were operated by Class 150 "Sprinters" or Class 153 "Super Sprinters", although Class 158 units did substitute on occasion.

An unusual working in March 2000 was a visit to Falmouth Docks by preserved Warship Class locomotive number D821 which was renamed Cornwall alongside the Royal Navy ship HMS Cornwall

Future

Mid-Cornwall Metro proposal
In 2022 the scheme was chosen to reach the next stage of the government's Restoring your Railway programme.

References

Citations

References

Notes

Further reading

External links

Great Scenic Railways in Devon and Cornwall.

Rail transport in Cornwall
Scenic railway lines in Devon and Cornwall
Community railway lines in England
Railway lines in South West England
Standard gauge railways in England
7 ft gauge railways